Fellini's Casanova is a 1976 Italian erotic historical romance film directed by Federico Fellini from a screenplay by himself and Bernardino Zapponi, adapted from the autobiography of 18th-century Venetian adventurer and writer Giacomo Casanova, portrayed by Donald Sutherland. The film depicts Casanova's life as a journey into sexual abandonment, and his relationship with the “love of his life” Henriette (played by Tina Aumont). The narrative presents Casanova's adventures in a detached, methodical fashion, as the respect for which he yearns is constantly undermined by his more basic urges.

Shot entirely at the Cinecittà studios in Rome, the film won an Academy Award for Best Costume Design, with the Oscar going to Danilo Donati. Fellini and his co-writer Bernardino Zapponi were nominated for a Best Adapted Screenplay Oscar. The film also won BAFTA Awards for Best Costume Design and Best Production Design, and a David di Donatello for Best Score.

Plot
Casanova visits one of Venice's islands to copulate with a fake nun for the pleasure of a rich voyeur. Casanova is frustrated that the man finds no interest in his research into alchemy and his further scheming. As he rows back to the mainland, Casanova is arrested, judged and imprisoned by the High Court over his famed debauchery.

During his time in prison, Casanova reminisces of his affairs with a dressmaker and later on with one of her junior employees, Anna Maria, who suffers from frequent fainting and requires constant bloodletting. Casanova escapes the prison through the roof and exiles himself from Venice, being taken into the Paris court of Madame d'Urfé. The Madame, an aged woman, enthralled by Casanova's apparent knowledge of alchemy, wishes to transform her soul into a man's through ritualistic intercourse with him. Fortuitously, Casanova encounters his brother, whose girlfriend he entices away.

Casanova then moves to the court of a hunchback, Du Bois, in between taking charge of a beautiful girl, Henriette. The lovers vow fidelity to each other, but the following morning Henriette has disappeared. Du Bois informs Casanova that an emissary of a faraway court has reclaimed Henriette, and she has requested that Casanova not attempt to follow her.

While in London, Casanova is robbed by two women and he attempts suicide by drowning himself in the Thames. A vision of a giantess and two dwarves distracts him; he follows them to a frost fair, where he arm-wrestles the giantess—a princess—and later pays to watch her bathe with the dwarves.

Casanova attends a deranged party at Lord Talou's palace in Rome, where he wins a bet over how many orgasms he can have in one hour. In Switzerland he falls in love with an alchemist's daughter, Isabella, who fails to keep an appointment to go to Dresden with him; Casanova instead partakes in an orgy within the hostel he's been stranded in. In Dresden, he has a brief chance encounter with his estranged mother in a theater. He then moves to a court in Württemberg, where his desire to be taken seriously as a writer/inventor is frustrated by the court's orgiastic, wild nature. It is here that he meets Rosalba, a mechanical doll with whom he shares a dance and later on has sex with.

Time goes by and an old Casanova finds himself librarian to Count Waldstein at his castle in Dux. Life at the castle is more than frustrating for Casanova, as he becomes an object of mockery and animosity. The final scene has a weary, bloodshot Casanova cringing in an armchair and recounting a recent dream. In this dream, Casanova is back in Venice. He chases the ghosts of his past lovers, all of whom disappear. An ornate stagecoach beckons him to join its passengers. He finally meets with Rosalba, the mechanical doll, once again and they dance with each other.

Cast

 Donald Sutherland as Giacomo Casanova
 Tina Aumont as Henriette
 Cicely Browne as Madame d'Urfé
 Carmen Scarpitta as Madame Charpillon 
 Clara Algranti as Marcolina
 Daniela Gatti as Giselda
 Margareth Clementi as Sister Maddalena
 Mario Cencelli as Dr. Mobius 
 Silvana Fusacchia as Isabella
 Olimpia Carlisi as Isabella's sister
 Leda Lojodice as Rosalba, the mechanical doll 
 Sandra Elaine Allen as Angelina the Giantess 
 Clarissa Mary Roll as Anna Maria
 Daniel Emilfork as the Marquis Du Bois
 Dudley Sutton as the Duke of Württemberg
 John Karlsen as Lord Talou
 Reggie Nalder as Faulkircher
 Harold Innocent as Count of St. Germain
 Marika Rivera as Astrodi 
 Alessandra Belloni as Princess
 Diane Kurys as Madame Charpillon's daughter
 Dan van Husen as Viderol
 Mary Marquet as Zanetta Farussi, Casanova’s mother
 Nicholas Smith as Francesco Giuseppe Casanova, Casanova’s brother

Production 
Fellini’s Casanova is noted for its symbolic, highly stylised mise en scène and the casting of Donald Sutherland in the lead role. Fellini's dislike of the character was well documented, and in one interview he even referred to exposing "the void" of Casanova's life. Producer Dino De Laurentiis suggested Robert Redford in the role of Casanova but Fellini refused to cast him. Jack Nicholson, Marcello Mastroianni, Alberto Sordi and Gian Maria Volonté were also considered for the role.  When De Laurentiis bowed out of the project and Fellini signed a new contract with producer Alberto Grimaldi, Donald Sutherland was cast in the role. Fellini required that he shave his head and wear both prosthetic nose and chin to give him a more grotesque appearance.

Fellini had to re-shoot parts of this movie, including the elaborate Venice carnival scene, when approximately seventy reels of film—including the first three weeks of shooting—were stolen at the Technicolor labs of Tiburtino, Rome, on August 27, 1975. The thieves were apparently interested in Pasolini's Salò, or the 120 Days of Sodom (1975), and some reels of this film were also stolen, along with half of Damiano Damiani's spaghetti western A Genius, Two Partners and a Dupe (1975).

Chesty Morgan and Barbara Steele were both cast in the film, but their scenes were deleted from the final cut.

Music was composed by Nino Rota, a frequent Fellini collaborator.

Awards and nominations

1977 Academy Award, United States
 Winner - Best Costume Design  (Danilo Donati)
 Nominated - Screenplay Based on Material from Another Medium (Federico Fellini, Bernardino Zapponi)

1977 David di Donatello Awards, Italy
 Winner - Best Music (Nino Rota)

1978 BAFTA, Great Britain
 Winner - Best Costume Design (Danilo Donati)
 Winner - Best Production Design/Art Direction (Danilo Donati, Federico Fellini)
 Nominated - Best Cinematography (Giuseppe Rotunno)

See also
 Carnival of Venice
 Cinema of Italy
 Histoire de ma vie, Casanova's autobiography

References

External links
 
 
 

Films directed by Federico Fellini
1976 films
1970s Italian-language films
Italian historical drama films
Titanus films
Films scored by Nino Rota
Films about Giacomo Casanova
Universal Pictures films
Films that won the Best Costume Design Academy Award
Films with screenplays by Federico Fellini
Films produced by Alberto Grimaldi
1970s Italian films